Schack Carl, rigsgreve (von) Rantzau or Carl Schack Rantzau-Ascheberg (11 March 1717, Ascheberg estate, Holstein – 21 January 1789, Menerbes, France) was a Holstein-born Danish-Norwegian officer and statesman. He was the commander-in-chief of the Norwegian army in 1766, but lost the position the next year. He is notable for his friendship with Johann Friedrich Struensee and his role in the coup which led to Struensee's fall from power in 1772.

Commander-in-chief of the Norwegian army 
In the 1760s he befriended Claude Louis de Saint-Germain, one of the most powerful men in Denmark-Norway at the time.
In 1766 he was promoted to lieutenant general, and on the initiative of Saint-Germain he was sent as Commander-in-chief of the Norwegian army, April 4 of the same year. Norway was not the right place for a man like Rantzau. He found it indescribably boring to live in the country, and in a letter he wrote; ..this Land of the Devil, where there is not even a tree strong enough for a man to hang himself. He insulted the people of Norway, with his manner of behaviour. The stay in Norway was a short one. When Saint-Germain got deposed at the end of 1767. Rantzau was ordered to immediately resign, and go to Holstein and stay there. When he left Christiania, stones were thrown at him by the city's inhabitants.

Under Struensees rule 
In Holstein, Rantzau became friend with Johann Friedrich Struensee. When Stuensee became regent of Denmark and Norway, in December 1770, 
he gave Rantzau a sentral role in the new regime. But Struensee sidelined Rantzau and they became enemies, and 17 January 1772 he was involved in deposing and arresting Struensee.

References

18th-century Danish politicians
18th-century German politicians
Norwegian military personnel
German generals
Danish generals
1717 births
1789 deaths
Schack Carl
Military personnel from Schleswig-Holstein